Toms Hartmanis (born 12 December 1987 in Liepāja, Soviet Union), is a Latvian ice hockey right winger currently playing for the HK Kurbads of the Latvian Hockey League. Professionally, he has played for the Newcastle Vipers of the British Elite Ice Hockey League, Dinamo Riga of the Kontinental Hockey League (KHL), Almtuna IS of the Swedish HockeyAllsvenskan, HK Riga 2000 of the Belarusian Belarusian Extraleague, and the Missouri Mavericks of the American Central Hockey League.

On September 9, 2011, Hartmanis signed with the Mavericks before the team's pre-season training camp.  Hartmanis was released by the Mavericks after training camp on October 17, 2011. He was confirmed as the latest signing for the Fife Flyers on October 25, 2011.

References

External links

1987 births
Living people
Almtuna IS players
Sportspeople from Liepāja
Latvian ice hockey right wingers
Dinamo Riga players
Newcastle Vipers players
Missouri Mavericks players
HK Riga 2000 players
Fife Flyers players
Braehead Clan players
Latvian expatriate sportspeople in England
Latvian expatriate sportspeople in Scotland
Latvian expatriate ice hockey people
Latvian expatriate sportspeople in Belarus
Latvian expatriate sportspeople in Sweden
Latvian expatriate sportspeople in the United States
Expatriate ice hockey players in the United States
Expatriate ice hockey players in Scotland
Expatriate ice hockey players in Belarus
Expatriate ice hockey players in Sweden
Latvian expatriate sportspeople in Kazakhstan
Expatriate ice hockey players in Kazakhstan
Expatriate ice hockey players in England